"Strike the Match" is a dance-pop song performed by German pop trio Monrose. It was co-written and produced by OneRepublic frontman Ryan Tedder and Deborah "SoShy" Epstein, involving additional co-production by Snowflakers, and released as the lead single of off the group's upcoming third studio album I Am (2008) on 6 June 2008 (see 2008 in music) in German-speaking Europe.

The song premiered on 23 May 2008 on German radio network Planet Radio and was first performed on the final episode of Germany's Next Topmodel, Cycle 3 on 5 June. Following its physical single release, "Strike the Match" debuted at number 10 on the German Singles Chart and within the top 20 in Austria and Switzerland. It also reached the top 40 on a composite Eurochart.

Music video 
The music video for "Strike The Match" was filmed in May 2008 in Germany. It made its television debut on 29 May  on German music network VIVA's show VIVA Live!.

It shows the girls dancing in a club with friends. Other scenes show them in front of a car at night, and in a digital black and white city.

Track listings

Notes
  denotes co-producer
  denotes vocal producer

Credits and personnel

Vocals: M. Capristo, S. Guemmour, B. Kızıl
Producer: Ryan "Alias" Tedder
Additional production: Jiant, Snowflakers
All instruments: R. Tedder
Additional instruments: Christian Ballard, Andrew Murray, Pete Kirtley

Mixing: C. Ballard
Engineering: R. Tedder
Recorded at Mansfield Studios, Hollywood, California
Vocal recording and arrangement: P. Kirtley
Vocal editing: P. Kirtley, Claus Üblacker

Charts

Weekly charts

Year-end charts

References

External links
 Official website

2008 singles
Monrose songs
Songs written by SoShy
Songs written by Ryan Tedder
2008 songs